The 2004 United States presidential election in Pennsylvania took place on November 2, 2004, and was part of the 2004 United States presidential election. Voters chose 21 representatives, or electors to the Electoral College, who voted for president and vice president.

Pennsylvania was won by Democratic nominee John Kerry by a 2.50% margin of victory. Prior to the election, most news organizations considered this a toss-up, or swing state. Although the Commonwealth of Pennsylvania voted for the Democratic presidential nominee in six subsequent elections since 1992, the margins of victory had become smaller over the past elections. On election day, Kerry won the state with 50.92% of the vote, but won only 13 of the 67 counties in Pennsylvania. Most of these 13 counties have the highest populations in the commonwealth. The biggest key to Kerry's victory was winning Philadelphia County with 80.44% of the vote.

Bush was the first president elected to two terms without carrying the Keystone State either time since Woodrow Wilson in 1912 and 1916, and is the only Republican president to not win the state at least once. This to date is the most recent election where Pennsylvania would back the losing candidate, and is thus tied with Wisconsin and Michigan as having the longest bellwether streak in the nation. This was also the first time since 1968 that the Keystone State voted against the winner of the national popular vote. 

As of 2022, this is the last time that Pennsylvania voted to the left of New Mexico and Nevada.

Primaries

Eligibility
In order to vote in the primary, one must have been:
 "A citizen of the United States for at least one month before the next primary, special, municipal, or general election."
 "A resident of Pennsylvania and the election district in which the individual desires to register and vote for at least 30 days before the next primary, special, municipal, or general election."
 "At least 18 years of age on or before the day of the next primary, special, municipal, or general election."
 A registered member of the party holding the primary

Convicted felons could not vote from prison and were not allowed to register to vote for five years after being released from prison.

Registration
Individuals could register to vote at County Voter Registration offices, through the mail, at a Department of Transportation office, or at various other government agency offices.

Voters must have been registered 30 days prior to the election in order to be eligible to vote.

Democratic primary election

The Democratic primary took place on April 27, 2004. It was open to registered Democrats only.

Results

Note: Twenty seven delegates remained uncommitted until they reached the floor of the convention. Kerry eventually received all 178 delegates from Pennsylvania.

Republican primary election
The Republican primary took place on April 27, 2004. It was open to registered Republicans only. Incumbent President George W. Bush ran unopposed.

General election

Predictions
There were 12 news organizations who made state-by-state predictions of the election. Here are their last predictions before election day.

Polling
Al Gore won Pennsylvania in 2000 with just over 50% of the vote. In late October 2004, the state was split at 47% on whether or not to approve of Bush. But Kerry won the poll 48% to 46% in the last Mason Dixon poll. Throughout the election of 2004, Kerry won most of the polls in the upper 40% to lower 50% range. However, Bush polled within the margin of error, usually in the mid 40% range. In the last Real Clear Politics average Kerry was leading with 48% and by almost a 1% margin.

Fundraising
Bush raised $5,030,349. Kerry raised $4,998,861.

Advertising and visits
Bush campaigned heavily in the state and dropped by here over 20 times in 2004. But it wasn't enough to swing the undecided voters as Kerry won the state's electors with almost 51% of the vote, slightly higher than Gore.

Analysis
This Kerry victory can be attributed to the overwhelmingly Democratic cities of Philadelphia, Pittsburgh, and Erie. Although Kerry-held cities which voted for the Senator by narrow margins assisted him in advancing his margin over President Bush, many political analysts underscored the fact that if Philadelphia were excluded, President George W. Bush would have won Pennsylvania by a fairly slim margin, with 2,663,748 versus 2,395,890 for Kerry. Although Pennsylvania is closely divided in most elections, it did not vote Republican in a presidential election from 1992 to 2012.

Philadelphia and Pittsburgh were the biggest contributors to Kerry's victory in Pennsylvania. However, many independents in suburban Philadelphia counties (Bucks, Delaware, Montgomery, and somewhat in Chester) voted for Kerry, which may well have been the deciding factor. Kerry also had narrow margins of victory around cities like Allentown, Scranton, Erie, and the traditionally Democratic Pittsburgh suburbs; he also garnered many votes in certain rural areas such as parts of the Poconos and the Laurel Highlands, and in cities like Reading, Johnstown, Harrisburg, and State College. Bush's margins were extremely large in Central Pennsylvania and the sparsely populated Northern Tier, with traditional GOP cities such as Lancaster, Lebanon, York, Altoona, Huntingdon, and Williamsport strongly throwing their support behind him. This area, along with rural western Maryland, was clearly the most conservative in the Northeast.

, this is the last presidential election that the Democratic candidate won any county bordering Allegheny County, namely Washington County, Beaver County and Fayette County. This is also the last election in which Dauphin County, Centre County, and Monroe County voted for the Republican candidate. This is also the last time that Chester County gave a majority to a Republican, although Mitt Romney did win the county with a plurality in 2012.

Results

By county

Counties that flipped from Democratic to Republican 
 Cambria (largest municipality: Johnstown)
 Carbon (largest municipality: Lehighton)
 Greene (largest municipality: Waynesburg)
 Lawrence (largest municipality: New Castle)
 Mercer (largest municipality: Hermitage)

By congressional district
Kerry won 10 of 19 congressional districts, including four held by Republicans. Bush won 9 districts, including one held by a Democrat.

Electors

Technically the voters of Pennsylvania cast their ballots for electors: representatives to the Electoral College. Pa. is allocated 21 electors because it has 19 congressional districts and 2 senators. All candidates who appear on the ballot or qualify to receive write-in votes must submit a list of 21 electors, who pledge to vote for their candidate and his or her running mate. Whoever wins the majority of votes in the state is awarded all 21 electoral votes. Their chosen electors then vote for president and vice president. Although electors are pledged to their candidate and running mate, they are not obligated to vote for them. An elector who votes for someone other than his or her candidate is known as a faithless elector.

The electors of each state and the District of Columbia met on December 13, 2004, to cast their votes for president and vice president. The Electoral College itself never meets as one body. Instead the electors from each state and the District of Columbia met in their respective capitols.

The following were the members of the Electoral College from the state. All 21 were pledged for Kerry/Edwards.
Lynne Abraham
Richard Bloomingdale
Blondell Reynolds Brown
Robert Casey Jr.
Eileen Connelly
H. William DeWeese
John Dougherty
Richard E. Filippi
William George
Renee Gillinger
Jennifer Mann
Robert J. Mellow
Dan Onorato
Juan Ramos
Stephen R. Reed
T.J. Rooney
Jonathan Saidel
John F. Street
Rosemary Trump
Sala Udin
Constance H. Williams

See also
 List of United States presidential elections in Pennsylvania

References

Pennsylvania
2004
Presidential